Below are the results of season 4 of the World Poker Tour television series (2005–2006).

Results

Mirage Poker Showdown
 Casino: The Mirage, Paradise, Nevada
 Buy-in: $10,000
 4-Day Event: May 23, 2005 to May 26, 2005
 Number of Entries: 317
 Total Prize Pool: $3,074,900
 Number of Payouts: 27
 Winning Hand: Q-Q

Grand Prix de Paris

 Casino: Aviation Club de France, Paris
 Buy-in: €10,000
 5-Day Event: July 25, 2005 to July 29, 2005
 Number of Entries: 160
 Total Prize Pool: €1,520,000
 Number of Payouts: 18

Legends of Poker

 Casino: Bicycle Casino, Los Angeles
 Buy-in: $5,000
 5-Day Event: August 27, 2005 to August 31, 2005
 Number of Entries: 839
 Total Prize Pool: $4,195,000
 Number of Payouts: 72
 Winning Hand:

Borgata Poker Open
 Casino: Borgata, Atlantic City
 Buy-in: $10,000
 4-Day Event: September 19, 2005 to September 22, 2005
 Number of Entries: 515
 Total Prize Pool: $4,995,500
 Number of Payouts: 45
 Winning Hand:

UltimateBet Aruba Poker Classic

 Casino: Radisson Aruba Resort & Casino, Palm Beach, Aruba
 Buy-in: $5,000
 6-Day Event: September 26, 2005 to October 1, 2005
 Number of Entries: 647
 Total Prize Pool: $3,235,000
 Number of Payouts: 125
 Winning Hand:

Doyle Brunson North American Poker Championship

 Casino: Bellagio, Las Vegas 
 Buy-in: $10,000
 4-Day Event: October 18, 2005 to October 21, 2005
 Number of Entries: 420
 Total Prize Pool: $4,074,000
 Number of Payouts: 100
 Winning Hand:

World Poker Finals

 Casino: Foxwoods, Mashantucket, Connecticut
 Buy-in: $10,000
 5-Day Event: November 13, 2005 to November 18, 2005
 Number of Entries: 783
 Total Prize Pool: $7,855,000
 Number of Payouts: 120
 Winning Hand:

Five Diamond World Poker Classic

 Casino: Bellagio, Las Vegas 
 Buy-in: $15,000
 5-Day Event: December 12, 2005 to December 16, 2005
 Number of Entries: 555
 Total Prize Pool: $8,075,250
 Number of Payouts: 100
 Winning Hand:

PokerStars Caribbean Poker Adventure

 Casino: Atlantis, Paradise Island
 Buy-in: $7,800
 5-Day Event: January 5, 2006 to January 10, 2006
 Number of Entries: 724
 Total Prize Pool: $5,477,700
 Number of Payouts: 130
 Winning Hand:

Gold Strike World Poker Open
 Casino: Gold Strike Resort and Casino, Tunica
 Buy-in: $10,000
 5-Day Event: January 19, 2006 to January 23, 2006
 Number of Entries: 327
 Total Prize Pool: $3,171,900
 Number of Payouts: 50
 Winning Hand:

Borgata Winter Poker Open

 Casino: Borgata, Atlantic City 
 Buy-in: $10,000
 4-Day Event: January 29, 2006 to February 1, 2006
 Number of Entries: 381
 Total Prize Pool: $3,695,700
 Number of Payouts: 75
 Winning Hand:

L.A. Poker Classic

 Casino: Commerce Casino, Los Angeles 
 Buy-in: $10,000
 6-Day Event: February 16, 2006 to February 21, 2006
 Number of Entries: 692
 Total Prize Pool: $6,643,200
 Number of Payouts: 45
 Winning Hand:

L.A. Poker Classic
 Casino: Commerce Casino, Los Angeles
 Buy-in:
 2-Day Event: February 22, 2006
 Number of Entries: 315
 Total Prize Pool:
 Number of Payouts:
 Winning Hand:

Bay 101 Shooting Star

 Casino: Bay 101, San Jose, California
 Buy-in: $10,000
 5-Day Event: February 27, 2006 to March 3, 2006
 Number of Entries: 518
 Total Prize Pool: $4,702,800
 Number of Payouts: 45
 Winning Hand:

World Poker Challenge

 Casino: Reno Hilton, Reno
 Buy-in: $5,000
 4-Day Event: March 27, 2006 to March 30, 2006
 Number of Entries: 592
 Total Prize Pool: $2,845,700
 Number of Payouts: 36
 Winning Hand:

Foxwoods Poker Classic

 Casino: Foxwoods, Mashantucket 
 Buy-in: $10,000
 4-Day Event: April 6, 2006 to April 9, 2006
 Number of Entries: 431
 Total Prize Pool: $4,175,200
 Number of Payouts: 40
 Winning Hand:

WPT Championship

 Casino: Bellagio, Las Vegas 
 Buy-in: $25,000
 7-Day Event: April 18, 2006 to April 24, 2006
 Number of Entries: 605
 Total Prize Pool: $14,671,250
 Number of Payouts: 100
 Winning Hand: 9-5

Other Events
During season 4 of the WPT there was one special event that did not apply to the Player of the Year standings:
 The WPT Celebrity Invitational - February 22–24, 2006 - Commerce Casino - postscript to Event #12: L.A. Poker Classic

References

World Poker Tour
2005 in poker
2006 in poker